Claire B. Konold (born February 13, 1938) is an American former politician. He served in the South Dakota House of Representatives from 1997 to 2004.

References

1938 births
Living people
People from Deuel County, South Dakota
Businesspeople from South Dakota
Republican Party members of the South Dakota House of Representatives